Edwin C. Kubale (November 22, 1899 – February 4, 1971) was an American football player and coach. He served as the head football coach at Centre College in Danville, Kentucky from 1928 to 1937 and Southwestern Presbyterian University—now known as Rhodes College—in Memphis, Tennessee from 1938 to 1941, compiling a career college football coaching record of 69–55–8. Kubale played college football at the Center position at Centre.

Centre College
Kubale came to Centre College from Fort Smith, Arkansas, where he played for coach Frank Bridges. Kubale played center for the Centre Praying Colonels. He replaced All-American Red Weaver at the center position in 1921, the same year that Centre upset Harvard 6 to 0. Walter Camp gave him honorable mention All-America in 1922. Kubale was captain of the 1923 team. He was twice selected All-Southern.  Kubale wore number 8.

Coaching career
Kubale coached in the National Football League (NFL) during the 1944 season for the Brooklyn Tigers. During his time with the Tigers he was a co-coach with Frank Bridges and Pete Cawthon.

Head coaching record

College

References

1899 births
1971 deaths
American football centers
Brooklyn Tigers coaches
Centre Colonels football coaches
Centre Colonels football players
Rhodes Lynx athletic directors
Rhodes Lynx football coaches
TCU Horned Frogs football coaches
All-Southern college football players
Sportspeople from Fort Smith, Arkansas
Coaches of American football from Arkansas
Players of American football from Arkansas
Players of American football from South Bend, Indiana